KHAD could refer to:

KHAD, the main security agency and intelligence agency of Afghanistan
KHAD (FM), a radio station (104.5 FM) in Upton, Wyoming, United States
Harford Field, the airport in Casper, Wyoming, United States, assigned ICAO code KAHD
KQQZ, a radio station in University City, Missouri, United States, known as KHAD from 1968 to 2000
KZQL, a radio station in Mills, Wyoming, United States, known as KHAD from 2005 to 2009
Khad, the traditional name of Phi Orionis